Guilherme da Silva Gonçalves (born 16 September 2001), commonly known as Guilherme Bala, is a Brazilian footballer who plays for Shabab Al Ahli as a forward.

Career statistics

Club

Honours

Club
Flamengo
Campeonato Brasileiro Série A: 2020

References

2001 births
Living people
Brazilian expatriate footballers
Association football forwards
Madureira Esporte Clube players
CR Flamengo footballers
Associação Ferroviária de Esportes players
Shabab Al-Ahli Club players
Campeonato Brasileiro Série A players
Campeonato Brasileiro Série D players
UAE Pro League players
Expatriate footballers in the United Arab Emirates
Brazilian expatriate sportspeople in the United Arab Emirates
Footballers from Rio de Janeiro (city)
Brazilian footballers